Ogcodes pallidipennis is a species of small-headed flies in the family Acroceridae.

References

Acroceridae
Articles created by Qbugbot
Insects described in 1866
Taxa named by Hermann Loew
Diptera of North America